Rough Diamonds is the sixth studio album by the English rock band Bad Company. The album was released in August 1982. Rough Diamonds, like its predecessor, Desolation Angels, was recorded at Ridge Farm Studio in Surrey, England, in March and April 1981 and engineered by Max Norman (famed for his work with Ozzy Osbourne).

It was the last album by Bad Company's original line-up and the most recent studio album to feature Paul Rodgers. The sessions were rough going from the beginning. First, their manager, Peter Grant, withdrew from view after the death of Led Zeppelin drummer John Bonham in 1980. Then, on another occasion, a fistfight broke out between Paul Rodgers and Boz Burrell, the two bandmates restrained by Mick Ralphs and Simon Kirke.

The album's opening track, "Electricland", written by Rodgers, was the album's biggest hit. Rodgers' "Painted Face" also received substantial airplay on rock stations. The album became the original line-up's worst-selling album, reaching a disappointing No. 26 on the Billboard album charts in 1982. The album was remastered and re-released in 1994.

Track listing

Personnel
Bad Company
 Paul Rodgers – vocals; lead guitar on "Painted Face", "Cross Country Boy" and "Downhill Ryder"
 Mick Ralphs – guitars
 Boz Burrell – bass
 Simon Kirke – drums
with:
 John Cook – piano, synthesizer
 Mel Collins – saxophone

Charts
Album – Billboard (United States)

Singles – Billboard (United States)

References

External links 
 Bad Company - Rough Diamonds (1982) album review by William Ruhlmann, credits & releases at AllMusic
 Bad Company - Rough Diamonds (1982) album releases & credits at Discogs
 Bad Company - Rough Diamonds (1982) album to be listened as stream on Spotify

Bad Company albums
1982 albums
Swan Song Records albums
Albums with cover art by Hipgnosis